Dədəli is a village in the Agsu Rayon of Azerbaijan.   The village forms part of the municipality of Ərəbmehdibəy.

References 

Populated places in Agsu District